Trey Gunn (born December 13, 1960) is an American musician, known for his membership in the progressive rock band King Crimson from 1994 to 2003, playing Warr Guitar and Chapman Stick.

Biography
A native Texan who now resides in Seattle, Washington, Gunn began his musical life at the age of seven playing classical piano. His interest in music grew through various instruments: electric bass, electric and acoustic guitar, keyboards, and the touch guitar. He moved to Eugene, Oregon, and played in punk bands while he completed a degree in classical music composition at the University of Oregon. He then moved to New York City, where his professional career began.

He spent some time as a student of Guitar Craft with founder Robert Fripp and appeared on several Robert Fripp and the League of Crafty Guitarists recordings. From 1988 to 1991, he toured playing Chapman Stick in the UK and Europe, with Toyah Willcox, Robert Fripp and Paul Beavis, at first under the band project name "Fripp, Fripp" who by the second tour became Sunday All Over the World. They recorded and released one album in 1991 entitled Kneeling at the Shrine. In the same year and with the SAOTW line up, he also played stick on the solo Toyah album Ophelia's Shadow, produced by Toyah who was to later guest on his album, The Third Star.

In 1992, he was asked to join David Sylvian and Robert Fripp in a collaborative project that toured the United States, Europe, and Japan. The band released The First Day and Damage – a live recording from the Royal Albert Hall in London. During this period, Gunn also recorded his first solo album One Thousand Years. 

In 1992 and 1993 with Fripp, Bert Lams, Hideyo Moriya, and Paul Richards, he toured and recorded as The Robert Fripp String Quintet.

In 1994, Gunn joined King Crimson. With King Crimson he played Chapman Stick and subsequently diverse types of Warr guitar and was part of the "double trio" formation opposite Tony Levin. In 1997, King Crimson fragmented into smaller configurations known as the ProjeKcts. Gunn, along with Fripp, participated in all of the ProjeKcts performances and recordings. In 1999, the group mutated into a four-piece – Belew, Fripp, Gunn and Mastelotto. He left Crimson after "The Power to Believe" tour in 2003. Over the course of his decade with the group, he participated in thirty-three King Crimson CDs, two DVDs and hundreds of performances.

He has also performed and recorded with a number of other musicians: Tool, Puscifer, Robert Fripp, Sean Malone and Gordian Knot, David Sylvian, Vernon Reid, John Paul Jones, Eric Johnson, Alice, Azam Ali, Matt Chamberlain, Michael Brook, Bill Rieflin, David Hykes of the Harmonic Choir and many more. He has released a number of solo albums, as Trey Gunn and as the leader of The Trey Gunn Band.

Years of working with broad-necked instruments like the Warr guitar affected Gunn physically and he had to seek less damaging playing methods for his artistic expression. This has led him to working with the guitar in a horizontal position across the lap and to the practice of Aikido and Brazilian Jui-Jitsu. In 2003, Gunn founded the multi-media group Quodia with Joe Mendelson where he contributed more vocals than in previous projects and less Warr guitar. In 2004, he and Pat Mastelotto started collaborating with Kimmo Pohjonen and Samuli Kosminen, forming KTU out of their respective duos TU and Kluster. In 2012, he began working with Jerry Marotta in the group The Security Project.

In addition to helping run a label based in Seattle called 7d Media, he is currently dividing his time between his solo work, film and television scoring, coaching artists in the creative process at Original Voice Coaching and building multi-dimensional media projects.

Discography

Solo albums
Playing with Borrowed Time (1985) (cassette)
One Thousand Years (1993)
The Third Star (1996)
Raw Power (1999)
The Joy of Molybdenum (2000)
Live Encounter (2001)
Road Journals (CD-ROM) (2002)
Untune The Sky (CD/DVD) (2003) (compilation)
Music for Pictures (2008)
Modulator (2010)
I'll Tell What I Saw (2010) (compilation)
The Waters, They Are Rising (2015)
Punkt 1 (2020)
Firma (2020)
Life on Hisarü 9 (2020) (with Markus Reuter)

Score Books
Trey Gunn - Scores (2014)
King Crimson - THRAK (2017) (full band transcriptions + tabs)
King Crimson - The Discipline Era Transcriptions (2020) (full band transcriptions + tabs)

With others

References

External links
 Trey Gunn homepage
 Trey Gunn downloads page
 Trey Gunn - Original Voice Coaching page
 7d Media homepage

King Crimson members
1960 births
People from Texas
Living people
Chapman Stick players
American rock guitarists
American male guitarists
University of Oregon alumni
Crafty guitarists
20th-century American guitarists
American aikidoka
American practitioners of Brazilian jiu-jitsu
Inside Out Music artists
Gordian Knot (band) members